The Rocky Mountain Lacrosse Conference (RMLC) is one of ten conferences in the Men's Collegiate Lacrosse Association. Currently the RMLC consists of 15 teams encompassing four Rocky Mountain states; Colorado, Utah, Montana, and Wyoming. It is divided into two divisions, Division I and Division II. Division II is separated further by region; Northwest and Southeast

History
The RMLC, first known as the RMLA, was formed in 1976 with founding members Colorado State University, University of Colorado, Regis University, Air Force Academy, University of Denver, and Colorado School of Mines. In 1997, the Conference changed names to the Rocky Mountain Intercollegiate Lacrosse League (RMILL) and went to a club-only league as a member of the US Lacrosse Intercollegiate Associates (USLIA), which reorganized into the Men's Collegiate Lacrosse Association (MCLA) in 2006.

The RMLC has been the home conference of the MCLA Division I National Champions in 1999, 2001, 2003, 2006, 2012 and 2013 (Colorado State University); in 1997, 2000, 2007, 2011 (Brigham Young University); and in 2014 (University of Colorado). In Division II, Westminster College were National Champions in 2008, and the University of Utah won in 2022.

In 2017, Utah announced that they were going to elevate their program to play as an NCAA Division 1 Independent, turning them from a club team to an NCAA team. After the 2018 season, they left the conference. In 2019, the RMLC announced that the University of Texas and the University of Oklahoma would join the conference at the Division 1 level starting in the 2020 season. Due to the COVID-19 pandemic, their first game in the conference had to be pushed back to 2021. In 2021, it was revealed that Oklahoma would leave the conference to go back to the Lone Star Alliance. With the news, Oklahoma would leave the conference without playing a single game in the conference.

Teams

Former teams

Conference Championships 

 Note: Bold text denotes MCLA National Champion
 Note: Italic text denotes MCLA National Champion runner-up

 Note: Bold text denotes MCLA National Champion
 Note: Italic text denotes MCLA National Champion runner-up

References

College lacrosse leagues in the United States